Bennigsen is a settlement, part of the town of Springe in Lower Saxony, Germany.

Bennigsen may also refer to:

People
Alexander Levin von Bennigsen (1809–1893), German politician
Alexandre Bennigsen (1913–1988), scholar of Islam in the Soviet Union
August von Bennigsen (1765–1815), Hanoverian officer
Avenir Bennigsen (1912–??), Soviet intelligence officer
Karl von Bennigsen (1789–1869), Hanoverian major general
Levin August von Bennigsen (1745–1826), Russian general
Rudolf von Bennigsen (1824–1902), German politician
Rudolf von Bennigsen (governor) (1859–1912), German colonial politician

Other
Bennigsen Beavers, German baseball and softball team based in Bennigsen